Fierro is a Spanish and Italian surname and middle name meaning "iron". Notable people with the name include:

Surnames
Fanny Carrión de Fierro (born 1936), Ecuadorian writer and literary critic
Gonzalo Fierro (born 1983), Chilean football player
Josefina Fierro de Bright (1914–1998), Mexican-American activist
Juan Fierro (born 1974), Chilean road cyclist
Julieta Norma Fierro Gossman (born 1948), Mexican astrophysicist
Lee Fierro (1929–2020), American actress
Martha Fierro (born 1977), Ecuadorian chess champion
Martin Fierro (saxophonist) (1942–2008), Mexican-American saxophonist
Michelle Fierro (born 1967), American artist
Oscar Zeta Acosta Fierro, author, lawyer, Chicano activist - made famous by his depiction as Hunter S. Thompson's attorney in the novel and later movie Fear and Loathing in Las Vegas
Rodolfo Fierro (1880–1915), General in the Pancho Villa army during the Mexican Revolution
Rodrigo Fierro (born 1930), Ecuadorian physician, writer and politician, Minister of Health of Ecuador from 1979 to 1981
Aurelio Fierro (1923–2005), Italian actor and singer

Middle names
Cynthia Fierro Harvey (born 1959), United Methodist Church bishop

Fictional characters
Martín Fierro, a fictitious character in a poem by Argentine José Hernández
Alex Fierro, a fictional character in Rick Riordan's Magnus Chase and the Gods of Asgard series

See also
Fiero (disambiguation)

References

Italian-language surnames
Spanish-language surnames